Liberal Studies is a school in the Faculty of Arts and Science at New York University. It houses the Liberal Studies Core Program and the Global Liberal Studies bachelor's degree program. Both of the department's programs employ a core curriculum in the liberal arts and emphasize global study in NYU's Global Network University framework.

Liberal Studies Core Program
The Liberal Studies Core Program is a two-year liberal arts academic program centered on the great books. First-year students study at NYU's campuses in New York City, London, Madrid, Washington D.C., or Florence. After the second year, students transfer to take up residence in one of NYU's other degree-granting colleges.

Global Liberal Studies
Global Liberal Studies is a four-year bachelor's degree program. First-year students study at NYU's campuses in New York City, London, Madrid, and Florence, before moving to New York City for the sophomore year. Third-year students are required to study at one of NYU's fourteen global academic centers.

References

Liberal Studies
Liberal arts colleges at universities in the United States
Liberal arts colleges in New York City
2009 establishments in New York City